Auratonota paramaldonada is a species of moth of the family Tortricidae. It is found in Ecuador.

The wingspan is about 27 mm. The ground colour of the forewings is whitish cream, with brownish and ferruginous brownish suffusions. The markings are brown. The hindwings are brown.

Etymology
The specific name refers to the similarity with Auratonota maldonada and is derived the name of that species, plus the Latin prefix para (meaning near).

References

Moths described in 2008
Auratonota
Moths of South America